Streetlight Lullabies is a full-length studio album by Toh Kay (Tomas Kalnoky, of Streetlight Manifesto), released November 22, 2011. The album features 10 acoustic solo versions of Streetlight Manifesto songs.

The album's cover art previously appeared on the back cover of the booklet for Everything Goes Numb.

Track listing

Reception
The album has received positive reviews, with many critics commenting positively on Kalnoky's skill as a guitarist and ability to keep the songs interesting despite the simplicity of the instrumentation. Negative comments usually focused on the derivative and unoriginal nature of the album (with all the material on the album being songs previously recorded by Streetlight Manifesto).

References

See also
 You By Me: Vol. 1
 Streetlight Manifesto

Tomas Kalnoky albums
2011 albums